The 400-499 range of area codes in Mexico is reserved for Aguascalientes, Guanajuato, Hidalgo, Jalisco, Estado de México, Michoacán, Nuevo León, Querétaro, San Luis Potosí, Tamaulipas, Veracruz and Zacatecas.

(For other areas, see Area codes in Mexico by code).

4